Greatest hits 3 is a vinyl album by Ensemble Renaissance, released in 1984 on the PGP RTB label, Ensemble's third album overall. It is their first greatest hits compilation with Medieval music on the A side and Renaissance music on the B side.
The material from this LP will find its place on their German CD Anthology in the remastered form.

Track listing
All tracks produced by Ensemble Renaissance

Personnel
The following people contributed to the Anthology

Dragana Jugović del Monaco – mezzo-soprano
Miroslav Marković – baritone
Dragan Mlađenović – tenor, crumhorns, sopranino recorder, rauschpfeife, jew's harp
Georges Grujić – recorders, sopranino rauschpfeife, bass crumhorn, soprano/bass cornamuse, tenor rackett
Dragan Karolić – recorders, tenor/bass cornamuse
Marko Štegelman – bagpipes
Miomir Ristić – fiddle, rebec, percussion instruments
Vladimir Ćirić – vielle, rebec, percussion instruments
Svetislav Madžarević – lute, percussion instruments

External links
album on discogs

1984 albums
Ensemble Renaissance albums